Deveron Alfredo Harper (born November 15, 1977) is a former American football defensive back who played four seasons in the National Football League (NFL) with the Carolina Panthers and New Orleans Saints. Harper played college football at the University of Notre Dame and attended Orangeburg-Wilkinson Senior High School in Orangeburg, South Carolina. He was also a member of the Scottish Claymores, Miami Dolphins, Austin Wranglers and Kansas City Brigade.

Professional career
Harper played in 24 games for the NFL's Carolina Panthers from 2000 to 2001. He was waived/injured by the Panthers on August 1, 2002. He played in 19 games for the New Orleans Saints of the NFL from 2004 to 2004. Harper was released by the Saints on October 12, 2004. He was signed by the Miami Dolphins of the NFL on August 10, 2005. He was released by the Dolphins on August 15, 2005. Harper signed with the Austin Wranglers of the Arena Football League (AFL) on October 18, 2005. He played for the AFL's Kansas City Brigade in 2007. He is now working in Harris Road Middle School as dean of students.

References

External links
Just Sports Stats
Notre Dame Fighting Irish bio

Living people
1977 births
American football defensive backs
African-American players of American football
Notre Dame Fighting Irish football players
Carolina Panthers players
New Orleans Saints players
Scottish Claymores players
Miami Dolphins players
Austin Wranglers players
Kansas City Brigade players
Players of American football from South Carolina
People from Orangeburg, South Carolina
Orangeburg-Wilkinson High School alumni
21st-century African-American sportspeople
20th-century African-American sportspeople